Amish believe large families are a blessing from God. Amish rules allow marrying only between members of the Amish Church. The elderly do not go to a retirement facility; they remain at home. As time has passed, the Amish have felt pressures from the modern world; their traditional rural way of life is becoming more different from the modern society. Isolated groups of Amish populations may have genetic disorders or other problems of closed communities. Amish make decisions about health, education, relationships based on their Biblical interpretation. Amish life has influenced some things in popular culture. As the Amish are divided into the Old Order Amish, New Order Amish, and Beachy Amish, the way of life of families depends on the rule of the church community to which they belong

Family and personal life

Having children, raising them, and socialization with neighbors and relatives are important functions of family in the Amish culture. Amish believe large families are a blessing from God.

The family has authority over the individual throughout life. A church district is measured by the number of families (households), rather than by the number of baptized persons. Families take turns hosting the biweekly preaching service. Parents accountable to the Lord for the spiritual welfare of their children.

Women have different chores from men, and chores within the home normally divided by gender. Formal education ends after eighth grade, following which children are trained for their adult tasks. Boys work with the father in the fields, in the barn, and around the buildings; girls work inside the home and garden, alongside the mother.

Youth and courtship
Rumspringa (Pennsylvania German lit. "jumping around") is the period of adolescence that begins the time of serious courtship. A certain amount of misbehavior is expected, but it is neither encouraged nor overlooked. At the end of this period, Amish young adults are baptized into the church and usually marry, with marriage permitted only among church members. A small percentage of the young people choose not to join the church, deciding to live the rest of their lives in wider society and marry someone outside the community.

The age for courting begins at sixteen (in some communities, the girl could be as young as fourteen). The most common event for boy-girl association is the fortnightly Sunday evening sing; however, the youth use sewing bees, frolics, and weddings for other opportunities. The sing is often in the same house or barn as the Sunday morning service. Teens may arrive from several close-by districts, thus providing socialization on a wider scale than from a single church.

At the sing, boys are on one side of a long table, the girls on the other side. Each person is able to announce his or her choice of a hymn, and only the faster ones are chosen. A conversation takes place between songs. The formal end of the sing is at about ten o'clock, after which there is talking, joking, and visiting. The boys who do not have a girlfriend may pair up with a Maidel (girl). Following this, the boy takes the girl home in his open-topped courting buggy.

Marrying a first cousin is not allowed among the Amish, but second-cousin relationships are allowed. Marriage to a "Schwartz" cousin (the first cousin once removed) is not permitted in Lancaster County.

Weddings
Weddings are held at anytime of the year, though not generally in December–February. The bride may pick whatever color dress she desires. She wears no makeup and will not receive an engagement or wedding ring because the Ordnung prohibits personal jewelry.

The marriage ceremony itself may take several hours, followed by a community reception that includes a banquet and singing. Newlyweds spend the wedding night at the home of the bride's parents.

Celery used to be one of the symbolic foods served at Amish weddings. Flowers would be used instead of celery to decorate the house. Rather than immediately taking up housekeeping, the newlywed couple will spend several weeks on a trip to a place they desire.

Retirement
When the Amish choose to retire is not fixed. Retirement is usually between the ages of fifty and seventy. The elderly do not go to a retirement facility; they remain at home. Often there is an adjacent dwelling, called the Grossdaadi Haus, where grandparents take up residence. Retired people continue to help with work on the farm and within the home.

The elderly maintain social contacts through community events, such as frolics, auctions, weddings, and holidays.

If the aged become ill or infirm, then the women of the family take up caring for them.

Lifestyle and culture
Amish lifestyle is dictated by the Ordnung (German, meaning: order), which differs slightly from community to community, and, within a community, from district to district (there are over 25 different Amish, Mennonite, and Brethren church groups in Lancaster County). What is acceptable in one community may not be acceptable in another. Groups may separate over matters such as the width of a hat-brim, the color of buggies, or various other issues. The use of tobacco (excluding cigarettes, which are considered "worldly") and moderate use of alcohol are generally permitted, particularly among older and more conservative groups.

Language
In addition to English, most Old Order Amish speak a distinctive German dialect called Pennsylvania German or, much more commonly, Pennsylvania Dutch. Pennsylvania German is related to the Palatinate German of the 18th century. It has also been strongly influenced by American English. The English term "Dutch" originally referred to all forms of German and Netherlandic languages. Pennsylvania German, which is a High German dialect, is distinct from Mennonite Low German and Hutterite German dialects spoken by other Anabaptist groups.

Now spoken primarily by the Old Order Amish and Old Order Mennonites, Pennsylvania German was originally spoken by many German-American immigrants in Pennsylvania and surrounding areas, especially those who came prior to 1800. There are also several sizable Old Order Amish communities where a variety of Swiss German is spoken, rather than Pennsylvania German. The Beachy Amish, especially those who were born roughly after 1960, tend to speak predominantly in English at home. All other Amish groups use either Pennsylvania German or a variety of Swiss German as their in-group language of discourse. There are small dialectal variations between communities, such as Lancaster County and Indiana speech varieties. The Amish are aware of regional variation, and occasionally experience difficulty in understanding speakers from outside their own area.

Clothing

The common theme among all Amish clothing is plainness; clothing should not call attention to the wearer by cut, color, or any other feature. Hook-and-eye closures or straight pins are used as fasteners on dress clothing rather than buttons, zippers, or velcro. Snaps are used on everyday clothes, and plain buttons for work shirts and trousers. The historic restriction on buttons is attributed to tradition and their potential for ostentation. Some groups tend to limit color to black (trousers, dresses) and white (shirts), while others allow muted colors. Dark blue denim work clothing is common within some groups as well. The Old Order Amish often sew their own clothing.

Women wear cape dresses, calf-length plain-cut dresses in a solid color. Aprons are often worn at home, usually, in white (typically for the unmarried) or purple or black (for the married), and are always worn when attending church. A cape, which consists of a triangular piece of cloth, is usually worn, beginning around the teenage years, and pinned into the apron. In the colder months, a long woolen cloak may be worn. Heavy bonnets are worn over the prayer coverings (known as the kapp) when Amish women are out and about in cold weather, with the exception of the Nebraska Amish, who do not wear bonnets. Girls in some areas may wear colored bonnets until age nine; older girls and women wear black bonnets. Girls begin wearing a cape for church and dress-up occasions at about age eight. Single women wear a white cape to church until about the age of thirty. Everyday capes are colored, matching the dress, until about age forty when only black is used.

Men typically wear dark-colored trousers, some with a dark vest or coat, suspenders (in some communities), broad-brimmed straw hats in the warmer months, and black felt hats in the colder months. However, some, mostly teenagers, may deviate from these customs to convey individuality. Married men and those over forty grow a beard. Mustaches are forbidden because they are associated with European military officers and militarism in general. A beard may serve the same symbolic function, in some Old Order Amish settings, as a wedding ring, and marks the passage into manhood.

Furniture

Amish furniture is furniture marketed as being made by the Amish, primarily of Pennsylvania, Ohio, and Indiana. It is generally known as being made of 100% wood, usually without particle board or laminate. Amish furniture making is often a skill passed through many generations. Because Amish beliefs prevent the use of electricity, many woodworking tools in Amish shops are powered by a hydraulic and pneumatic power that is run on diesel generators. No piece of furniture is ever identical to another because of the care taken to select the wood. The grain is different on every piece of wood, and the craftsmen often try to highlight the features of each individual piece.

Education

The Amish do not educate their children past the eighth grade, believing that the basic knowledge offered up to that point is sufficient to prepare one for the Amish lifestyle. Almost no Amish go to high school, much less to college. In many communities, the Amish operate their own schools, which are typically one-room schoolhouses with teachers (young unmarried or married men and women) from the Amish community. In Indiana, most children will go to public schools from kindergarten to eighth grade. These schools provide education in many crafts, and are therefore eligible as vocational education, fulfilling the nationwide requirement of education through the 10th grade or its equivalent.

There are Amish children who go to non-Amish public schools, even schools that are far away and that include a very small Amish population. In the past, there have been major conflicts between the Amish and outsiders over these matters of local schooling; for the most part, they have been resolved, and the educational authorities allow the Amish to educate their children in their own ways.

Sometimes, there are conflicts between the state-mandated minimum age for discontinuing schooling, and the younger age of children who have completed the eighth grade. The Amish claim that educating their children beyond eighth grade is a violation of their religious beliefs, and so, have been granted exemptions of this mandate. In the past, in comparisons of standardized test scores of Amish students, the Amish have performed above the national average for rural public school pupils in spelling, word usage, and arithmetic. They performed below the national average in vocabulary.

On May 19, 1972, Jonas Yoder and Wallace Miller of the Old Order Amish, and Adin Yutzy of the Conservative Amish Mennonite Church, were each fined $5 for refusing to send their children, aged 14 and 15, to high school. In Wisconsin v. Yoder, the Wisconsin Supreme Court overturned the conviction, and the U.S. Supreme Court affirmed this, finding the benefits of universal education do not justify a violation of the Free Exercise Clause of the First Amendment.

Music
Amish music is primarily German in origin, including ancient singing styles not found anywhere in Europe. Sacred music originates from modern hymns derived from the Pennsylvania Dutch culture.

Singing is a major part of Amish churches and some songs take over fifteen minutes to sing. "Lob Lied" is a well known Amish song. It is always the second song sung at an Amish church service and is often sung at Amish weddings.

Older Amish hymns are monophonic, without meter, and feature drawn-out tones with slowly articulated ornamentation. Pennsylvania spirituals are more contemporary and include a wide variety of influences. Although a few Amish learn to play traditional instruments such as the harmonica or the accordion, instruments are not played in public. Thus, singing is usually unaccompanied.

"Sings" or "Singings" are attended by young people approaching marriage-age. They are usually held in barns on a Sunday evening after a worship service and are an essential element in Amish courting practices as the young participants are encouraged to engage in social discourse between songs.

While singing in church is in German, singing outside of the church is more often in English than in Pennsylvania German, even though the Amish know many traditional worldly Pennsylvania German songs. The most popular performer of worldly Pennsylvania German songs is John Schmid, who is also very popular among the Amish.

Transport

Amish people are more likely to die in traffic accidents when modern vehicles driven by non-Amish collide with the slower horse-drawn Amish buggies. In Pennsylvania between 2003 and 2013, over 600 buggy accidents took place. Levi Shetler, of the conservative Swartzentruber Amish, was reported to have been involved in fourteen crashes by the age of 54, with one fatality. Direct causes of these crashes range from cars using headlights that blind passengers and horse, to recklessness or texting by drivers of motorized vehicles.

Non-resistance has led violent perpetrators to take advantage of Amish as in the case of the West Nickel Mines School shooting. Kidnapping by non-Amish is also a common crime against Amish youth.

Use of modern technology

The Older Order Amish avoid certain modern technologies. Amish do not view technology as evil, and individuals may petition for acceptance of a particular technology in the local community. In Pennsylvania, bishops meet in the spring and fall to discuss common concerns, including the appropriate response to new technology, and then pass this information on to ministers and deacons in a subsequent meeting. Because of this flat governing structure, variations of practice develop in each community.

High voltage electricity was rejected by 1920 through the actions of a strict bishop, as a reaction against more liberal Amish and to avoid a physical connection to the outside world. Petrol-powered farm equipment, such as tillers or mowers, may be pushed by a human or pulled by a horse. Amish farmers employ chemical pesticides, chemical fertilizers, and artificial insemination of cows.

The Ordnung is the guide to community standards, and a doctrine that defines sin. For example, the four Old Order Amish communities of Allen County, Indiana, are more conservative than most; they use open buggies, even during the winter, and they wear black leather shoes even in the hot summer.

Restrictions are not meant to impose suffering. Disabled people are allowed to use motorized wheelchairs; electricity is allowed in the home for medical equipment. Those who break the rules may be given many months to resolve the problem so that they can remove electric wiring from a new house.

Although most Amish will not drive cars, they will hire drivers and vans, for example, for visiting family, weekly grocery shopping, or commuting to the workplace off the farm, though this too is subject to local regulation and variation. Moreover, a horse and buggy can only sustain  over an extended distance, and thus is impractical for emergencies. The Amish are permitted to travel by bus and train in order to shop, work at markets, and reach more distant destinations. Regular bus service between Amish communities has been established in some areas. The Amish are not permitted to travel by airplane as air travel is regarded as too modern.

The Old Order Amish tend to restrict telephone use, as it is viewed by some as interfering with separation from the world. It intrudes into the privacy and sanctity of the family, and interferes with social community by eliminating face-to-face communication. Amish of Lancaster County use the telephone primarily for outgoing calls, with the added restriction that the telephone not be inside the house, but rather in a phone "booth" or small out-building placed far enough from the house as to make its use inconvenient. These private phones may be shared by more than one family. This allows the Amish to control their communication, and not have telephone calls invade their homes, but also to conduct business, as needed. In the past, the use of public pay phones in town for such calls was more common; today, with dwindling availability of pay phones because of increased cell phone use by the non-Amish population, Amish communities are seeing an increase in the private phone shanties. Many Amish, particularly those who run businesses, use voicemail service. The Amish will also use trusted "English" neighbors as contact points for passing on family emergency messages. Some New Order Amish will use cellphones and pagers, but most Old Order Amish will not.

Use of technology by different Amish affiliations 

There are many restrictions on technology that are more or less universal among the Old Order Amish, as the ban on cars as well as the ban on radio, television and in most cases the use of the internet, see above. Concerning farm and home technology, there are quite some differences between different Amish affiliation, as the table below indicates.

The three affiliations: "Lancaster", "Holmes Old Order", and "Elkhart-LaGrange" are not only the three largest affiliations, they also represent the mainstream among the Old Order Amish. The most conservative affiliations are above, the most modern ones below. Technologies used by very few are on the left, the ones used by most are on the right. The percentage of all Amish, who use a technology is also indicated approximately.

 * Natural gas allowed

Relations with non-Amish
As time has passed, the Amish have felt pressures from the non-Amish. Child labor laws, for example, threaten their way of life, and raise questions regarding the treatment of children in an Amish household, and also in the way the Amish view emotional and medical support. There is a negative perception regarding how the Amish choose to view some medical conditions as being 'the will of God', without always receiving modern medical treatment found in hospitals or medical clinics. Amish children often follow in the tradition of being taught at an early age to work jobs in the home on the family's land or that of the community.

Contrary to popular belief, some of the Amish vote, and they have been courted by national parties as potential swing voters: while their pacifism and social conscience cause some of them to be drawn to left-of-center politics, their generally conservative outlook causes most to favor the right wing.

They are nonresistant, and rarely defend themselves physically or even in court; in wartime, the Amish take conscientious objector status. Their own folk-history contains tales of heroic nonresistance, such as the insistence of Jacob Hochstetler (1704–1775) that his sons stop shooting at hostile Indians, who proceeded to kill some of the family and take others captive. During World War II, the Amish entered Civilian Public Service.

Amish rely on their church and community for support, and reject the concept of insurance. An example of such support is barn raising, in which the entire community gathers together to build a barn in a single day.

In 1961, the United States Internal Revenue Service announced that since the Amish refuse Social Security benefits and have a religious objection to insurance, they do not need not pay these taxes. In 1965, this policy was codified into law. Self-employed individuals in certain sects do not pay into, nor receive benefits from, United States Social Security, nor do their similarly exempt employees. Internal Revenue Service form 4029 grants this exemption to members of a religious group that is conscientiously opposed to accepting benefits of any private or public insurance, provides a reasonable level of living for its dependent members and has existed continuously since December 31, 1950. Amish employees of non-Amish employers are taxed, but they do not apply for benefits. Aside from Social Security and workers' compensation, American Amish pay all required taxes.
 
At least one group of Amish farmers in Lancaster County, Pennsylvania, has formed a cooperative engaged in Community Supported Agriculture (CSA) agreements with non-Amish families.  Working through the Lancaster Farm Fresh Cooperative  this group of Amish farmers provide organic vegetables to CSA groups in Pennsylvania and surrounding states, including New York.

Crimes and discrimination against Amish
The Amish have, on occasion, encountered discrimination and hostility. During the two 20th-century World Wars, Amish nonresistance sparked many incidents of harassment, and young Amish men forcibly inducted into the services were subjected to various forms of ill treatment. In the present day, anti-Amish sentiment has taken the form of pelting the horse-drawn carriages used by the Amish with stones or similar objects as the carriages pass along a road, most commonly at night. A 1988, made-for-TV film, A Stoning In Fulham County, is based on a true story involving one such incident, in which a six-month-old Amish girl was struck in the head by a rock and died from her injuries. In 1997, Mary Kuepfer, a young Amish woman in Milverton, Ontario, Canada, was struck in the face by a beer bottle believed to have been thrown from a passing car. She required thousands of dollars' worth of surgery to her face; this was paid for by an outpouring of donations from the public.

See also
List of U.S. states by Amish population
Bank of Bird-in-Hand
John A. Hostetler

References

Works cited

Further reading

External links
Harmonies Workshop - Amish Music
 In Amish Country, the Future Is Calling - The New York Times

Amish